Hunan Subdistrict is a subdistrict in Tiedong District, Anshan, Liaoning province, China. , it has 8 residential communities under its administration.

See also 
 List of township-level divisions of Liaoning

References 

Township-level divisions of Liaoning
Anshan